The enzyme ent-kaurene synthase (EC 4.2.3.19) catalyzes the chemical reaction

ent-copalyl diphosphate  ent-kaurene + diphosphate

This enzyme belongs to the family of lyases, specifically those carbon-oxygen lyases acting on phosphates.  The systematic name of this enzyme class is ent-copalyl-diphosphate diphosphate-lyase (cyclizing, ent-kaurene-forming). Other names in common use include ent-kaurene synthase B, ent-kaurene synthetase B, ent-copalyl-diphosphate diphosphate-lyase, and (cyclizing).  This enzyme participates in diterpenoid biosynthesis.

In Stevia
In Stevia spp., ent-kaurene synthase is a required part of the biosynthesis of steviol. Hajihashemi et al., 2013 find that it is involved in the drought stress response and  because it mimics drought stress  paclobutrazol toxicity. Both inhbit transcription of steviol glycoside synthesis genes including ent-kaurene synthase. This is believed to reduce steviol content in the final plant product.

References

 
 
 
 

EC 4.2.3
Enzymes of unknown structure